Cigoli is a village in Tuscany, central Italy, administratively a frazione of the comune of San Miniato, province of Pisa.

Cigoli is about 44 km from Pisa and 5 km from San Miniato. The painter Lodovico Cardi, known as "Cigoli", was born in the town in 1559.

References 

Frazioni of the Province of Pisa